Moods (also referred to as Moods Featuring Paul Quinichette) is the 1954 debut album by American jazz saxophonist Paul Quinichette featuring compositions and arrangements by Quincy Jones released on the EmArcy label. The tracks were recorded on two session dates in November 1954 with two different line-ups, an (almost) regular jazz sextet with flutist Sam Most as second horn player and two guitarists. The second session featured an Afro-Cuban combo with Herbie Mann on flute and also on tenor saxophone and Latin percussion instead of a drum set. The difference between the two sessions was preserved in splitting the album with the later recorded Latin jazz session on the LP's A-side, the more straight ahead approach on the other.

Reception

Allmusic awarded the album 3 stars with its review by Scott Yanow stating, "The mixture of straight-ahead and Afro-Cuban jazz works quite well".

Track listing
All compositions by Quincy Jones except as indicated
 "Tropical Intrigue" - 3:04
 "Grasshopper" - 4:02
 "Dilemma Diablo" - 4:03
 "I Can't Believe That You're in Love with Me" (Jimmy McHugh, Clarence Gaskill) - 6:44
 "Plush Life" - 7:48
 "You're Crying" - 3:13
 "Shorty Georgie" (Harry Edison, Count Basie) - 6:33
 "Pablo's Roonie" - 4:53
Recorded at Fine Sound Studios, New York City on November 4 (tracks 5–8) and November 22 (tracks 1–4), 1954

Personnel 
Quincy Jones - arranger for all tracks
Tracks 1–4 (Side A of original LP)
Paul Quinichette - tenor saxophone
Herbie Mann - flute, tenor saxophone
Jimmy Jones - piano
Al Hall - bass
Tommy Lopez - congas
Manny Oquendo - bongos
Willie Rodriguez - timbales
Tracks 5–8 (Side B of original LP)
Paul Quinichette - tenor saxophone
Sam Most - flute
Sir Charles Thompson - piano
Jerome Darr, Barry Galbraith - guitar
Paul Chambers - bass
Harold Wing - drums

References 

1955 debut albums
Albums arranged by Quincy Jones
Paul Quinichette albums
EmArcy Records albums